Kerameikos is a station on Athens Metro Line 3. It opened on 26 May 2007 as part of the  extension.

History

Proposals for a metro station at Kerameikos started with the Second Smith Study of 1974, and was reaffirmed by the SOFRETU proposal of 1978. Kerameikos was originally part of the original "Olympic Metro" scheme of the Athens Metro, and the station was supposed to be located south-west of the junction with Iera Odos and Peiraios Street. However, construction on the station stopped in 1998, due to an archaeological dispute. Construction of Kerameikos resumed at a new location in Gazi, and the original station box became an underground car park.

Station layout

References

Athens Metro stations
Railway stations opened in 2007
2007 establishments in Greece